María Reyes Maroto Illera (born 19 December 1973) is a Spanish economist and politician who has been serving as Minister of Industry, Trade and Tourism in the government of Prime Minister Pedro Sánchez since 2018.

Early life and education
Although Maroto was born in the town of Medina del Campo (province of Valladolid), her parents are natives and residents of the also Valladolid town of Ataquines, where she spent her childhood and youth. She graduated in Economics from the University of Valladolid.

Career in academia
Maroto worked in the Ideas for Progress Foundation between 2011 and 2013, and has been an associate professor in the Department of Economics at the Charles III University of Madrid.

Political career

Regional deputy 
Candidate number 20 on the list of the Spanish Socialist Worker's Party (PSOE) for the regional elections of May 2015 in the Community of Madrid, Marto was elected and became deputy of the Assembly of Madrid, in which she served as socialist spokeswoman in the Committee of Budgets, Economy, Finance and Employment. She resigned from her parliamentary seat on 6 June 2018.

Minister of Industry, Trade and Tourism, 2018–present 
Maroto was appointed by Prime Minister Pedro Sánchez to integrate his new Council of Ministers, following the motion of censure that the PSOE presented against the previous government of Mariano Rajoy (PP) and that was approved by the Congress of Deputies on 1 June 2018. Felipe VI sanctioned her appointment as holder of the portfolio of Industry, Commerce and Tourism by royal decree, becoming the first woman to held the post. On 7 June she took office as Minister before the King at Palace of Zarzuela.

Controversy
On 26 April 2021, Reyes Maroto received an envelope with a bloodstained razor or knife, days after Minister of Interior Fernando Grande-Marlaska, former Second Deputy Prime Minister Pablo Iglesias, and Director of the Guardia Civil María Gámez received envelopes with bullets inside of them.

When the Cumbre Vieja volcano on La Palma began to erupt on 19 September 2021, Reyes Maroto declared that the eruption on La Palma could be used as a tourist attraction to lure visitors. Her comments caused widespread criticism, because the Cumbre Vieja volcano is dotted with numerous homes, public buildings and businesses which began to be destroyed by the lava flows. Later, due to mounting criticism, including from opposition politicians, Reyes Maroto retracted her words.

References

1973 births
21st-century Spanish women politicians
Government ministers of Spain
Industry ministers
Living people
Members of the 10th Assembly of Madrid
Members of the 13th Congress of Deputies (Spain)
Members of the Socialist Parliamentary Group (Assembly of Madrid)
People from Medina del Campo
Charles III University of Madrid
Spanish economists
Industry ministers of Spain
Spanish Socialist Workers' Party politicians
University of Valladolid alumni
Women government ministers of Spain
Women members of the Congress of Deputies (Spain)
Members of the 14th Congress of Deputies (Spain)